Srbija FF is a Swedish football club located in Stockholm.

Background
Srbija FF currently plays in Division 3 Stockholm Södra which is the sixth tier of Swedish football. They play their home matches at the Mälarhöjdens IP in Stockholm.

The club is affiliated to Stockholms Fotbollförbund.

Season to season

Footnotes

External links
 Srbija FF – Official website

Football clubs in Stockholm
1992 establishments in Sweden
Serbian sports clubs outside Serbia
Diaspora football clubs in Sweden